Soy un delincuente (English: I Am a Criminal) is a 1976 Venezuelan film by director Clemente de la Cerda, based on the autobiography of Ramón Antonio Brizuela.
The film was a blockbuster hit in Venezuela, surpassing even big American productions such as Jaws, and is considered one of the most important films in the movement called "Nuevo Cine Venezolano".
Some critics suggest that this film is clearly influenced by Italian neorealism, introducing common elements such as the presence of non-professional actors and use of real streets as settings for scenes.
The film won the Special Jury Prize at the Locarno International Film Festival in 1977.

Synopsis

The film tells the story of Ramón Antonio Brizuela, who since childhood has to deal with rampant violence and the drugs, sex and petty thievery of a Caracas slum. Starting with delinquency, Ramón moves on to serious gang activity and robberies. 
He grows into a tough, self-confident young man who is hardened to violence. 
His views change when his fiancée's brother is killed in a robbery.

References

External links
 

Venezuelan drama films
1976 films
1970s Spanish-language films
Films directed by Clemente de la Cerda